Barbara Young may refer to:

Barbara Young, Baroness Young of Old Scone (born 1948), Labour member of the British House of Lords
Barbara Young (actress) (born 1931), British actress
Barbara Young (poet) (1878–1961), American art and literary critic, and poet
Barbara Arrowsmith Young (born 1951), creator of the Arrowsmith Program
Barbara G. Young, TSR roleplaying game magazine editor
Barbara M. Young, judge on the Supreme Court of British Columbia
Barbara Young (Neighbours), fictional character on Australian soap opera Neighbours